Fox was a pan-Asian pay television channel, owned and operated by Fox Networks Group Asia Pacific, a subsidiary of Disney International Operations.

The network operated six subnetworks, all solely branded as Fox; one pan-Asian feed meant for East Asia, then individual feeds for Japan, Thailand, The Philippines, Taiwan, and Vietnam. All of the networks carried network programming with the original English audio from its imported programmes, along with either subtitling or second audio feeds in each nation's dominant language. It also held a brand licensing deal with Tcast until the end of 2020 for a domestic version of Fox in South Korea.

History 
In Japan, the channel launched in February 1998 along with other Fox channels such as Fox Crime and Fox Life (now FOX bs238).

In Asia, the channel was in test broadcast in December 2009, broadcasting US TV series on loop. The first Asian provider who carried Fox was SkyCable in the Philippines which launched the channel on 4 January 2010, followed by StarHub TV in Singapore on 1 February 2010. Other TV providers across the region followed thereafter.

Around early-to-mid-February 2012, the Fox wordmark was changed to the Fox HD wordmark (pictured) for all Fox commercials on all Fox channels in the Asian and Filipino television provider networks, including channels which were not in HD. This change was similar to the one done to Star World, FX, Fox Crime, and Channel V. The reason for this change is unknown.

Fox Japan and Fox Korea are considered separated from the main feed as they have different programming. However, they are closely linked as they shared most of their commercials and the programming are nearly the same.

Fox Taiwan was officially launched on 1 September 2012, as FOX Showbiz replacing Channel V Taiwan. This feed's broadcast Asian programming and some of American series reruns with Chinese subtitles, and FOX HD Asia feed are available through MOD and some of cable providers. The feed was renamed Fox in January 2014 and broadcast both local and foreign programmes.

In 2020, due to the ongoing expansion of the Star brand internationally, Tcast, the licensor for the Fox channels in South Korea, announced that it had terminated its license agreement with Disney's domestic division, rebranding its channels after 31 December 2020. Fox in South Korea then became Ch.NOW.

On 31 August 2021, the Fox Networks Group channels ended operations in Hong Kong. The entire Fox Networks Group suite in Asia (outside networks in Taiwan and Japan) subsequently ended operations at the end of 30 September 2021, with most of its content transferred to Disney+ and Hotstar.

On 1 January 2022, Fox Taiwan was renamed to Star World, marking the return of the Star World brand in Taiwan after it closed on 1 February 2020.

References 

Asia
Defunct television channels
Television stations in Hong Kong
Television channels and stations established in 2009
Television channels and stations disestablished in 2021
English-language television stations
Mass media in Asia
Cable television in Hong Kong